Shawn Lipman (born 25 September 1964) is an American South African-born rugby union player.

He was inducted into the US Rugby Hall of Fame in 2019, together with US Internationals Luke Gross and Vaea Anitoni. Lipman was also inducted into the National Jewish Sports Hall of Fame in 2004, with others such as Sandy Koufax, Mark Spitz, and Shawn Green.

Lipman has been inducted into four other sporting Halls of Fame; the USA Maccabiah Rugby Hall of Fame, Santa Monica Rugby Club Hall of Fame, Southern California Jewish Sports Hall of Fame and Legends of the Maccabiah.

United States
Including non-test games, he has played in over 20 international matches.

Lipman joined Wits University Rugby Club at Under-20 level in 1983, from Sandringham High School, where he was a first team player, having received full colours in rugby. He represented Transvaal Under-20s whilst playing at Wits and also South Africa in the 1985 Maccabiah Games.

He represented the United States in the 1991 Rugby World Cup. Lipman also represented the US national team in over 20 international matches, including 9 test matches. Lipman played against some of the best national teams and players in the world, including the  New Zealand All Blacks, England, and France.

Lipman had a very successful run in the Maccabiah Games, having captained the US team in the 1993 Maccabiah Games and the 1997 Maccabiah Games, and represented the US in the 1989 Maccabiah Games and South Africa in the 1985 Maccabiah Games. He was selected as MVP of the Maccabiah Games Rugby Event in 1989, 1993, and 1997. In the Maccabiah competition, he won gold in 1985; bronze in 1989; silver in 1993; and gold in 1997. He was elected as the flag bearer for the United States delegation in 1997.

Lipman toured South Africa in 1988 with the Pacific Coast Grizzlies, playing against the top provincial teams in South Africa, including Western Province, South African Defence, Eastern Transvaal, and with victories against Natal, Orange Free State, and Boland.

Lipman was inducted into the USA's National Jewish Sports Hall of Fame in 2004 along with some of the best professional athletes in the United States, including Mark Spitz. He earned the MVP of the Year Award at the Santa Monica Rugby Club eight times, and in 2006 was also inducted into that club's Hall of Fame.

In 2009 Lipman came out of retirement at the age of 44 to represent the United States at the 2009 Maccabiah Games, winning a bronze medal. This culminated a 24-year career of playing at the Maccabiah Games, winning 2 Gold Medals, 1 Silver, and 2 Bronze Medals as a player.

In June 2011 he was inducted into his third sports hall of fame. Along with Taylor Mays of the San Francisco 49ers and Doug Gottlieb of ESPN, Lipman was inducted into the Southern California Jewish Sports Hall of Fame.

In 2013 he was Head Coach of the USA Maccabi Rugby Team that competed at the 19th World Games. The team won the gold medal in sevens, and the bronze medal in fifteens.

In 2017, Lipman led the US team to the 20th 2017 Maccabiah Games as Head Coach, and together with US international star Zack Test and with the team captained by US Eagle Kevin Swiryn, the team won the gold medal in fifteens, beating  the favored South African side 31-21. Lipman is the only player to ever win a gold medal for rugby at the Maccabiah Games both as a player and coach.

Lipman was inducted into the Maccabi USA Rugby Hall of Fame in 2018, and the US Rugby Hall of Fame in 2019. 
In 2021 he was named to the All American List of best US Rugby Players.

In 2022 he was named as a Legend of the Maccabiah, the highest honor bestowed by USA Maccabi, along with other former and current professional athletes Doug Gottlieb, Chelsey Goldberg, Benny Feilhaber, and Olympic swimmer Andi Murez.

Maccabiah Games

  Captained the US Maccabiah Team at the 1997 and 1993 Maccabiah World Games, winning Gold 1997, Silver 1993.
  Represented the US Maccabiah Team at the 1989 Maccabiah World Games, winning Bronze and South Africa in 1985, winning Gold
  Selected Most Valuable Player of the Games in 1989, 1993, and 1997
  Flag Bearer for the United States delegation at the 1997 Maccabiah World Games
  Represented US Maccabiah Team at the 2009 Maccabiah World Games, winning Bronze
  Selected as Head Coach of the US Maccabiah Rugby Team for the 2013 World Games
  Coached the US team to a Gold Medal in Rugby Sevens in 2013
  Coached the US team to a Bronze Medal in Rugby Fifteens in 2013
  Most medals won by an open athlete in team sports ever at the World Maccabiah Games
  Coached Team USA to win the gold medal at the 2017 Maccabiah Games.
  Only person to win a Gold Medal as a player and coach in Rugby at the World Maccabiah Games

Honors and biography
  Named as one of Best 50 US internationals by a national sports publication
  Inducted into the National Jewish Sports Hall of Fame in 2004, with others such as Sandy Koufax, Mark Spitz, and Shawn Green.
  Represented Transvaal Under-20 provincial representative side in South Africa
  Selected as MVP of the Santa Monica Rugby Club in seven seasons
  Represented US representative side at the Melrose Sevens
  Represented the US against international sides, including
 
 
 
 
 
 
 
 
 
 

On 26 June 2011, he was inducted into the Southern California Jewish Sports Hall of Fame.

Full Colors	 – Sandringham High School	 (1982)
Rugby Scholarship	 – University of Witwatersrand (1983 to 1985)
Most Improved Player	 – University of Witwatersrand	 (1983)
University Half Blues	 – University of Witwatersrand	 (1984)
Gold Medal	 – World Maccabiah Games	 (1985)
Most Valuable Forward	 – Santa Monica Rugby Club	 (1988)
Craig Sweeney Award (MVP)	– Santa Monica Rugby Club	 (1989)
Most Valuable Player	 – World Maccabiah Games	 (1989)
Bronze Medal	 – World Maccabiah Games	 (1989)
Most Valuable Forward	 – Tucson International Tournament	 (1990)
Most Valuable Forward	 – Santa Monica Rugby Club	 (1991)
Craig Sweeney Award (MVP)	– Santa Monica Rugby Club	 (1991)
Craig Sweeney Award (MVP)	– Santa Monica Rugby Club	 (1992)
Craig Sweeney Award (MVP)	– Santa Monica Rugby Club	 (1993)
Most Valuable Player	 – World Maccabiah Games	 (1993)
Silver Medal	 – World Maccabiah Games	 (1993)
Most Valuable Forward	 – Santa Monica Rugby Club	 (1995)
Most Valuable Player	 – World Maccabiah Games	 (1997)
Gold Medal	 – World Maccabiah Games	 (1997)
Hall of Fame Inductee	 – National Jewish Sports Hall of Fame	(2004)
Hall of Fame Inductee	 – Santa Monica Rugby Club (2006)
Most Valuable Player	 – Huntington Beach Sevens Open Tournament (2006)
Bronze Medal	 – World Maccabiah Games	 (2009)
Hall of Fame Inductee-	 Southern Calif. Jewish Sports Hall of Fame (2011)
Gold Medal	 – World Maccabiah Games	 Rugby Fifteens (2009)
Bronze Medal	 – World Maccabiah Games	Rugby Sevens (2009)
Gold Medal	 – World Maccabiah Games	 Rugby (2013)
Hall of Fame Inductee	 – Maccabi USA Rugby Hall of Fame (2018)
Hall of Fame Inductee	 – US Rugby Hall of Fame (2019)
All American List - Named to the All American List of best US Rugby Players (2021)
Legend of the Maccabiah - highest honor bestowed by USA Maccabi (2022)

Youth Rugby
Lipman founded the West Valley Wolverines Youth Rugby Club in 2003, and was the Head Coach and President until 2010. The club started with his two sons and 8 other children and grew to over 80 players. The club focused on fun and development in introducing rugby to children aged between 5 and 12 in the West San Fernando Valley.

Professional career
Lipman is also an entrepreneur who has started and sold companies in the healthcare, real estate, entertainment, and eCommerce spaces. He currently serves as CEO of Feedonomics, a product feed platform.

See also

List of select Jewish rugby union players

References

External links
Eight Will be Inducted into the U.S. Rugby Hall of Fame in it Class of 2019 – US Rugby Foundation

Feedonomics CEO, Shawn Lipman, to be inducted into the 2019 U.S. Rugby Hall of Fame | Feedonomics™

Maccabi USA Rugby Hall of Fame to Induct Ray Cornbill, Stuart Krohn, and Shawn Lipman

Maccabiah Gold A Special Journey

Maccabiah Gold A Special Journey
Shawn Lipman Appointed as Head Coach for Maccabi USA's Open Men's Rugby Team for the 20th World Maccabiah Games
US Maccabiah Rugby » Shawn Lipman
Maccabi USA Rugby and Hall of Fame: Weinstein, Simon, Levine, Ebner.
Maccabi and the Dolphins -
Interview with Jewish Hall of Famer Shawn Lipman
CRC Players to Take Part in Maccabi Games
USA Team Named for Maccabiah Games
Rugby: U.S. Team for Maccabiah Trains With Navy Seals
Rugby Hall of Famer Shawn Lipman Buys Sinbad's Hidden Hills Estate
Convenient Insurance

American rugby union players
South African rugby union players
Jewish rugby union players
South African Jews
Rugby union players from Johannesburg
Living people
1964 births
Maccabiah Games medalists in rugby union
Jewish American sportspeople
United States international rugby union players
Maccabiah Games gold medalists for South Africa
Maccabiah Games gold medalists for the United States
Maccabiah Games silver medalists for the United States
Maccabiah Games bronze medalists for the United States
Competitors at the 1985 Maccabiah Games
Competitors at the 1989 Maccabiah Games
Competitors at the 1993 Maccabiah Games
Competitors at the 1997 Maccabiah Games
Competitors at the 2009 Maccabiah Games
21st-century American Jews
Rugby union flankers